Jacobs Ranch is a large open-pit coal mine located 15 miles southeast of Wright, Wyoming in the coal-rich Powder River Basin. In 2007, the mine produced 38.1 million short tons of coal, making it the fourth-largest coal mine by production in the United States.

Information

Until 2009 the Jacobs Ranch mine was owned by Rio Tinto Energy America, an American-based subsidiary of the international mining giant Rio Tinto Group. In early 2009, Rio Tinto reached an agreement to sell the Jacobs Ranch mine to Arch Coal for $761 million.

References

Mines in Campbell County, Wyoming
Former Rio Tinto (corporation) subsidiaries
Mines in Wyoming
Coal mines in the United States